The water polo tournament at the 1996 Summer Olympics was held from 20 to 28 July 1996, in Atlanta, United States.

Qualification

Teams

GROUP A

GROUP B

Squads

Preliminary round

Group A

Saturday 20 July 1996

Sunday 21 July 1996

Monday 22 July 1996

Tuesday 23 July 1996

Wednesday 24 July 1996

Group B

Saturday 20 July 1996

Sunday 21 July 1996

Monday 22 July 1996

Tuesday 23 July 1996

Wednesday 24 July 1996

Classification round

Friday 26 July 1996

Saturday 27 July 1996

Sunday 28 July 1996

Final round
{{Round8-with third

|||12||8
|||5||4
|||6||8|||9||11|||6||7|||7||6

|||7||5

|||18||20}}

Quarterfinals
Friday 26 July 1996

Semifinals
Saturday 27 July 1996 — 5th/8th placeSaturday 27 July 1996 — 1st/4th placeFinals
Sunday 28 July 1996 — 7th placeSunday 28 July 1996 — 5th placeSunday 28 July 1996 —  Bronze medal matchSunday 28 July 1996 —  Gold medal match'''

Ranking and statistics

Final ranking

Multi-time Olympians

Five-time Olympian(s): 1 player
 : Manuel Estiarte

Four-time Olympian(s): 3 players
 : George Mavrotas, Anastasios Papanastasiou
 : Jordi Sans

Medallists

See also
1994 FINA Men's World Water Polo Championship
1998 FINA Men's World Water Polo Championship

References

Sources
 PDF documents in the LA84 Foundation Digital Library:
 Official Report of the 1996 Olympic Games, v.3 (download, archive) (pp. 56–73)
 Water polo on the Olympedia website
 Water polo at the 1996 Summer Olympics (men's tournament)
 Water polo on the Sports Reference website
 Water polo at the 1996 Summer Games (men's tournament) (archived)

External links
 
 Results

 
1996 Summer Olympics events
O
1996
1996